Vanchiyoor Radha is an Indian actress in Malayalam movies. She was one of the prominent supporting actresses in late 1960s and 1970s in Malayalam movies. She has acted in more than 50 movies.

Biography
She is born at Vanchiyoor, Thiruvananthapuram. She was a theater artist before becoming a cine artist. She debuted with the movie Vidhyarthikal in 1966 as Prem Nazir's sister. She is married to Narayana Pilla. The couple have two sons. She currently resides with her husband at Mahalingapuram, Chennai.

Partial filmography

Nishasurabhikal (2000)
 Shabdham Velicham (1990)
Thoranam (1987)
 Nee Allenkil Njan (1987) as Balachandran' s mother
Aval Kaathirunnu Avanum (1986)
Pourusham (1983) as Achamma
Marmaram (1982)
Ruby My Darling (1982)
Kilinjalgal (1981) - Tamil film
Abhinayam (1981)
Benz Vasu (1980)
 Theenalangal (1980)
Ithikkarappakki (1980)
Karipuranda Jeevithangal (1980)
Deepam (1980) as Bhargavi
Anthappuram (1980)
Chandrahaasam (1980) as Elizabeth
Avano Atho Avalo (1979) as Gawri's mother
Vellaayani Paramu (1979) as Pathumma
Lisa (1978)
Kanyaka (1978) as Bivathu
Sathrathil Oru Raathri (1978)
Thamburatti (1978) as Rema's mother
Ninakku Njaanum Enikku Neeyum (1978)
Snehathinte Mukhangal (1978)
Nivedyam (1978)
Samudram (1977)
Aparaajitha (1977)
Ormakal Marikkumo (1977) as Teacher
Yatheem (1977)
Aval Oru Devaalayam (1977)
Light House (1976) as Madhaviyamma
Aalinganam (1976)
Omanakkunju (1975)
Veendum Prabhaatham (1973)
Driksakshi (1973) as Doctor
Azhakulla Saleena (1973)
Kaalachakram (1973) as Subadra
Udayam (1973) as Saramma teacher
Chukku (1973)
Panimudakku (1972)
Maravil Thirivu Sookshikkuka (1972) as Valsamma
Akkarappacha (1972)
Puthrakameshti (1972)
Ernakulam Junction (1971)
Yogamullaval (1971)
 Vivahasammanam (1971) as Bhargavi
Vithukal (1971) as Madhavi
Vilaykku Vaangiya Veena (1971)
Mindaapennu (1970) as Narayani
Rahasyam (1969) as santha
Kattu Kurangu (1969)
Viruthan Shanku (1968) as Kumudam
Sreerama Pattabhishekam (1962) as Mallika
Snehadeepam (1962) as Madhavi

References

External links

Actresses in Malayalam cinema
Indian film actresses
Actresses from Thiruvananthapuram
Living people
Year of birth missing (living people)
Indian stage actresses
20th-century Indian actresses
Actresses in Tamil cinema